Eggy or Eggie may refer to:

 nickname of Nathan Eglington (born 1980), Australian field hockey player
 a character in the novel Laughing Gas by P. G. Wodehouse
 a character in the BBC TV series Count Arthur Strong
 a recurring character in the animated TV series The Penguins of Madagascar
 Eggy the Ram, mascot of the Ryerson Rams, the athletic teams of Ryerson University in Toronto, Ontario, Canada
 the 1970 winner of the Gardenia Stakes (Garden State Park) American Thoroughbred horse race
 a Gogo's Crazy Bones collectible figurine
 "Eggie", nickname of Eugenia Apostol (born 1925), Filipino publisher who played pivotal roles in the peaceful overthrow of Philippine presidents Ferdinand Marcos and Joseph Estrada
 Eggie (brand), a brand of clothing

See also
 Eggsy, a member of the Welsh comedic rap music group Goldie Lookin Chain
 Gary "Eggsy" Unwin, main character of the spy films Kingsman: The Secret Service and  Kingsman: The Golden Circle